Brian Michael Brennan (born February 15, 1962) is a former professional American football player who was selected by the Cleveland Browns in the fourth round of the 1984 NFL Draft. He graduated from Brother Rice High School (Michigan). He was a teammate of quarterback Doug Flutie at Boston College and played in nine NFL seasons from 1984 to 1992 for the Browns, the Cincinnati Bengals, and the San Diego Chargers.

Brennan is an executive at Key Bank.

College statistics
1981: 37 catches for 726 yards with 3 TD
1982: 12 catches for 305 yards with 3 TD
1983: 66 catches for 1,149 yards with 8 TD

References 

1962 births
Living people
People from Bloomfield, Oakland County, Michigan
Players of American football from Michigan
American football wide receivers
Boston College Eagles football players
Cleveland Browns players
Cincinnati Bengals players
San Diego Chargers players
American sports announcers
Brother Rice High School (Michigan) alumni